Lake Nipisso is a   lake in a remote part of the Côte-Nord region of Quebec, Canada.

Location

Lake Nipisso is in the unorganized territory of Rivière-Nipissis in the Sept-Rivières Regional County Municipality, Côte-Nord.

The lake is a widening of the Nipisso River, which flows into its north end from Lac Premio-Réal and Lac de Mouches in the northeast, and continues from its south end in a southeast direction to the Nipissis River, of which it is a tributary.

There is no road access to the lake, which can only be reached by float plane or helicopter.

Environment

The region is in the boreal climate zone.
Under Quebec's classification of ecological regions, the lake is in ecological sub-region 6j-S: High hills of Nipissis and Magpie lakes, within the bio-climatic sub-domain 6 East: Eastern Moss Spruce.

Topography

The region is near the southern border of the Canadian Shield, and is a rolling to rugged upland, with mountains reaching .
The Nipissis and Nipisso run through deep valleys in this upland.
Lake Nipisso is in what was once a deeper valley parallel to the Nipissis-Wacouno valley.
The valley was filled by glaciers with boulders and pebbles in a matrix of silt and sand.
Subsequently these deposits were reworked by the present river.

In the south of the Nipisso Lake area there are signs of intense glacial erosion, but there are few glacial deposits.
North of 50°50' there are greater quantities of glacial debris, with large amounts of sand and gravel in the valleys, and many sand plains.
These are at right angles to the direction of the Laurentide Ice Sheet movement, and may be recessional moraines.

Geology

Lake Nipisso and Lake Manitou to the east define the Manitou-Nipisso geological area, which is part of the Polycyclic Belt of the Grenville Province.
The bedrock of the lake is in the Manitou Gneiss Complex, and is mostly composed of quartz–feldspar gneiss and hornblende–biotite gneiss.
A 1997 study of a mineral property about 2/3 of the way up the east shore found most of the units present in the Nipisso-Manitou geological complex, including felsic gneisses, abundant gabbro and minor granitoid intrusives. 
The property had mineralized ultramafic dikes associated with a brecciated felsic pipe.

Tributary lakes

Lakes that drain into Lake Nipisso include:

Toponymy
The name is Montagnais in origin.
Former names include Lac Moisi, Lac Moisic and Lac Moisie.

Notes

Sources

Lakes of Côte-Nord
Sept-Rivières Regional County Municipality